The 2022 Ohio Bobcats football team represented Ohio University as a member of the East Division of the Mid-American Conference (MAC) in the 2022 NCAA Division I FBS football season. They were led by second-year head coach Tim Albin and played their home games at Peden Stadium in Athens, Ohio.  They finished the season 10–4 and 7–1 in the MAC and won the MAC East for the first time since 2016.   They lost to Toledo in the MAC Championship Game.  Ohio defeated Wyoming in the Arizona Bowl

Ohio entered the 2022 season with coming off of their worst season since 2003 and was precited to finish near the bottom of the MAC East. The Bobcats finished their non-conference schedule 2–2 with high-scoring home wins 41–38 over Florida Atlantic and 59–52 over FCS Fordham and with losses at power conference foes Penn State and Iowa State.  They opened conference play with an overtime loss to media preseason MAC East favorite Kent State where they surrendered 736 offensive yards to the Golden Flashes.  After a 55–34 win over MAC cellar dweller Akron in which Akron passed for 418 yards, the Bobcats got back to .500 on the season with a 3–3 record and 1–1 mark in the conference.  While Ohio's offense was prolific and the passing attack was setting records behind MAC Player of the year quarterback Kurtis Rourke who had 537 yards against Fordham, Ohio's defense was struggling mightily.  Through six games Ohio was surrendering 40.6 points, 561 yards, and 387 passing yards per game.  However, the Akron win was the beginning of a second half winning streak during which the defense would turn things around dramatically.

In the seventh game Ohio notched their second MAC win and first road win of the season with a 33–14 win over Western Michigan. Ohio's defense gave up only 14 points while forcing 6 turnovers, 5 of which were interceptions, and getting 5 sacks.  Ohio defeated Northern Illinois with Rourke only passing for 200 yards.  The defense led the way holding the Huskies to 17 points.  In a home game against Buffalo for control of the MAC East, Rourke threw a school record tying 5 touchdown passes in an easy 45–24 win.  The Bulls were held to 260 total yards on the game.

Ohio went on the road for wins over rival Miami (OH) and Ball State.  Rourke threw tor 362 yards and 3 touchdowns against the RedHawks but suffered a season ending torn ACL against the Cardinals. Ohio was forced to rely on its running game and defense.  The Bobcats ran for 224 yards with 148 and two touchdowns coming from MAC Freshman of the Year Sieh Bangura.  Ohio's defense forced three turnovers and held the Cardinals to 18 points.  With Rourke and Parker Navarro out for the season Ohio turned to CJ Harris at quarterback to wrap up the division against Bowling Green.  Harris led the Bobcats to a 38–14 win.  Again, it was the running game and defense that led the way as the Falcons were held to 279 yards of offense.  Prior to the season the university installed new turf in Peden Stadium.  The field at Peden was christened "Frank Solich Field" after the MAC's all-time coaching wins leader to whom Albin was a long time assistant and replaced after Solich's retirement before the prior season.  With the win over Bowling Green, Ohio remained unbeaten on the new field.  After the regular season Albin was named MAC Coach of the Year.

Ohio offense struggled in 17–7 championship loss to Toledo.  The Bobcats rebounded to win the Arizona Bowl 30–27 in overtime over Wyoming where Harris was named the MVP

Previous season

The Bobcats finished the 2021 season 3–9 and 3–5 in the MAC to finish in third place in the East Division. This was Ohio's first losing season since 2008.

Offseason

Transfers 
Source:

Outgoing

Incoming

Recruiting

Preseason

Preseason polls

Media Poll
On July 26 the MAC announced the preseason poll.  Ohio was picked to finish fourth in the East and received no votes to win conference.

Coaches Poll
On August 29 the MAC released the coaches poll.  Ohio was selected fifth the East.

Award watch lists

Schedule

Game summaries

vs. Florida Atlantic

Ohio recovered from an early deficit and then had to hold on to avoid surrendering a late 17 point lead in winning a shootout against Florida Atlantic.  Quarterback Kurtis Rourke and freshman kicker Nathanial Vakos both earned MAC East Player of the Week awards.

at Penn State

Penn St jumped out to an early lead and pulled away in an easy 46–10 over the Bobcats.

at Iowa State

The Bobcat offense was shut down for the second straight week as 2022 Iowa State held them to a season low 233 yards in an easy victory for the Cyclones.

vs. Fordham

In another shootout win Kurtis Rourke passed for 537 yards which was the most in Bobcat History while earning his second MAC East Offensive Player of the Week award of the season. Fordham's Fotis Kokosioulis broke the Patriot League record for receiving yards in a game with 320 and was player of the week for the entire FCS.

at Kent State

Kent State won a shootout in overtime.  Ohio's defense continued to struggle giving up 736 yards in the game of which 711 was in regulation.  Kent State's running back Marquez Cooper and wide receiver Dante Cephas became the first FBS teammates to respectively get 240 yards rushing and receiving in the same game.

vs. Akron

Ohio won by 21 points in spite of surrendering 473 yards to Akron. Through six games Ohio was surrendering 40.6 points, 561 yards, and 387 passing yards per game to opposing offenses. The Bobcat offense continued to shine helping Ohio get to 3–3 on the season and with their first conference win and a 1–1 recorf in the MAC.  Sam Wiglusz had 7 catches for 144 yards and 2 touchdowns while Kurtis Rourke had 427 yards passing and 4 touchdowns along with 32 rushing yards. However, it was Sieh Bangura who won MAC East Offensive Player of the Week with 92 rushing yards and 4 total touchdowns.

at Western Michigan

Ohio's defense had their best game of the season to this point giving up only 14 points while forcing 6 turnovers, 5 of which were interceptions, and getting 5 sacks and 8 tackles for losses.  However, the passing offense was slowed some for the first time since back to back games against power five teams Penn State and Iowa St. as Kurtis Rourke was held to 264 yards. It was the running game on offense and impressive kicking that carried the way. Freshman running back Sieh Bangura earned his second straight MAC East Offensive Player of the Week and Nataniel Vakos earned his second special teams player of the week award of the season by converting on 4 field goals including a career long 55 yards.  That helped the Bobcats score 33 points to defeat Western Michigan.

vs. Northern  Illinois

Ohio picked up its third straight win.  The defense led the way for a second straight game, giving up only 17 points, while Ohio's passing game was held to a season low to that point 200 yards.

vs. Buffalo

In a Tuesday night game Ohio became the only team in the MAC East to control its own destiny buy defeating Buffalo who had been unbeaten in MAC play.  Ohio jumped out to a 24–3 lead behind 3 touchdown passes by Kurtis Rourke.  Two of these touchdown receptions were by Sam Wiglusz and one was by Jacoby Jones. With 1:20 left in the half a 20-yard punt by Ohio setup Buffalo for a quick touchdown drive just before halftime.  Ohio received the second half kickoff up by 14 but Rourke threw an interception that was returned by Buffalo's Keyshawn Cobb for a touchdown on the third play from scrimmage in the second half.  Buffalo was back to within 24–17.  The Bobcats responded with another Rourke touchdown pass caught by Miles Cross on the ensuing drive.  Ohio fumbled on its next drive setting up another Buffalo touchdown to get the Bulls back within 7.  A fourth quarter touchdown run by Jake Neatherton and a school record tying fifth touchdown pass by Rourke to Miles Cross sealed the win for the Bobcats.

Ohio's defense continued its sudden second half turnaround as they held Buffalo to 260 total yards.  Linebacker Keye Thompson had 11 tackles and 2 fumble recoveries.  Thompson and Rourke were named MAC East Defensive and Offensive Players of the week.

at Miami (OH)

Ohio maintained control of its own destiny in the MAC East with a win over Miami in the Battle of the Bricks.  The Bobcats held a 10–7 halftime lead after a 1-yard run touchdown by Sieh Bangura in the first quarter and a Nathanial Vakos field goal on the last play of the half.  Ohio's offense took over the game in the second half.  They scored on all 5 possessions in the half. The first three drives all ended on touchdown passes from Kurtis Rourke who threw for 363 yards in the game.  The Ohio offense was able to hold the ball for 41:20 which helped the defense continue its second half improvement as they held Miami to 314 total yards and 69 yards on the ground.  Mac Hippenhammer was the bright spot for Miami as he caught three touchdown passes from Brett Gabbert.

at Ball State

Starting quarterback Kurtis Rourke was injured in the second quarter of the game and Ohio was forced to rely on its running game and defense to defeat Ball State.  The Bobcats ran for 224 yards with 148 and two touchdowns coming from Sieh Bangura.  Ohio's defense forced three turnovers and held the Cardinals to 18 points. Safety Alvin Floyd had an interception ad 12 tackles to earn MAC East Defensive player of the week.

vs. Bowling Green

With starting quarterback Kurtis Rourke and backup Parker Navarro out for the season and the MAC East title on the line, Ohio tuned to CJ Harris at quarterback. 
The Bobcats changed their air it out style of offense that was prolific most of the season with Rourke at the helm and played to Harris's strengths by keeping the ball on the ground with 54 total rushing attempts for 204 yards on the game.  This helped Ohio to a lopsided sided edge in time of possession for the third straight game.  The defense took advantage and continued their significant second half of the season turnaround in holding the Falcons to 279 yards and netting 3 interceptions and a fumble recovery.  Linebacker Keye Thompson led the way with 11 tackles and won MAC East Defensive Player of the Week for the second time in 2022.

Both offenses opened the game very sluggishly.  Neither team got a first down on each of their first two drives.  It was Bowling Green that struck first on a 44 yd pass from Matt McDonald to Tyrone Broden.  But Ohio struck back with a five-yard run touchdown by Harris and, following an interception of McDonald, a Harris touchdown pass to Sam Wiglusz on their next two drives. After a Falcon punt, Sieh Bangura put Ohio in command with a 21–7 lead after a 3-yard touchdown run with 3:42 left in the half.  Tariq Drake set Ohio up to score again with an interception of McDonald that was returned to the Falcon 14 with 39 seconds left in the half.  Harris took advantage with an 8-yard touchdown run on the third play of the drive just before halftime.

After the teams exchanged punts to open the half the Bobcats ate up most of what was left on the third quarter with a 15 play drive that ended in a Nathanial Vakos field goal.  Harris's third touchdown run of the game early in the fourth quarter put the game out of reach with a 38–7 lead.  Harris finished with 196 passing yards, 65 rushing yards, and accounted for 4 touchdowns and was named MAC East Offensive Player of the Week.  A late Falcon touchdown made the final 38–14.  The Bobcats won the MAC East for the first time since 2016 and the right to take on Toledo in the MAC championship.

vs. Toledo

Toledo came in to the championship game with the #1 defense in the MAC and was able to shut down Ohio's offense.   The Bobcats were held to 7 points and 262 total yards and were denied their first conference championship since 1968. Toledo struck first behind a 29-yard run by Jacquez Stuart.  Ohio evened things in the second quarter with a 2-yard run by Sieh Bangura.  An interception by quarterback Ohio's CJ Harris, playing for the injured MAC player of the Year, Kurtis Rourke, allowed Toledo to go into the half with a 10–7 lead on a field goal with 16 seconds remaining.  That was all the points the Rockets would need.  A fourth quarter touchdown reception by DeMeer Blankumsee from Dequan Finn made the final 17–7 in a defensive slugfest.

vs. Wyoming

Wyoming scored on their first possession on a run by Jordon Vaughn.  Ohio scored on a deep pass from CJ Harris to Jacoby Jones on their first possession. Ohio faked the extra point attempt.  Holder Jonah Wieland passed to Justin Holloway for a two-Point Conversion.  Wyoming was stopped on their second drive but Ohio fumbled the punt.  That led to an Andrew Peasley pass to Treyton Welch for a touchdown on the ensuing play and a 14–8 Wyoming lead.  Ohio made the score 14–11 with a field goal on their next drive.  Both teams failed to get points on each of both teams' next two drives but Wyoming went into the half up by 6 with a long 53-yard field goal by John Hoyland.  The teams exchanged four consecutive punts before Ohio regained the lead on a run by Sieh Bangura.  After Torrie Cox Jr. intercepted a Peasley pass the teams exchanged punts again before Ohio extended their lead to four on a second Nathanial Vakos field goal.  Wyoming marched down the field and took the lead on another Jordon Vaughn run with just two minutes remaining.  Ohio tied the game with just four seconds remining on a third field goal from Nathanial Vakos. Wyoming was held to a field goal on their first possession in overtime.  On Ohio's possession they reached a 3rd down and 8 yards to go from the Wyoming 10 yard line when CJ Harris hit Tyler Foster in the back corner of the end zone sealing Ohio's first bowl win since the Famous Idaho Potato Bowl following the 2019 season.  CJ Harris was named the game's MVP with 184 yards passing aand two touchdowns.

Statistics
''Through December 30, 2022

Source:

Team

Individual Leaders

Passing

Rushing

Receiving

Defense

Key: POS: Position, SOLO: Solo Tackles, AST: Assisted Tackles, TOT: Total Tackles, TFL: Tackles-for-loss, SACK: Quarterback Sacks, INT: Interceptions, BU: Passes Broken Up, PD: Passes Defended, QBH: Quarterback Hits, FR: Fumbles Recovered, FF: Forced Fumbles, BLK: Kicks or Punts Blocked, SAF: Safeties, TD : Touchdown

Special teams

Personnel

Coaching staff
Since July 14, 2021, the head coach of the Ohio Bobcats has been Tim Albin. He heads a staff of ten assistant coaches, four graduate assistants, a director of football operations, a director of recruiting & player personnel, and an assistant director of player personnel

`

Roster

Source:

Depth chart

Source:

Awards and honors

Weekly Awards

Midseason Award watch lists

Award Finalists

All-MAC Awards 

Source

National Awards

Rankings 

Source:

References

Ohio
Ohio Bobcats football seasons
Arizona Bowl champion seasons
Ohio Bobcats football